The 2021 Split Open II was a professional tennis tournament played on clay courts. It was part of the 2021 ATP Challenger Tour. It took place in Split, Croatia between 12 and 18 April 2021.

Singles main-draw entrants

Seeds

 Rankings are as of 5 April 2021.

Other entrants
The following players received wildcards into the singles main draw:
  Duje Ajduković
  Duje Kekez
  Nino Serdarušić

The following players received entry into the singles main draw using protected rankings:
  Dustin Brown
  Thanasi Kokkinakis

The following players received entry into the singles main draw as special exempts:
  Pedro Cachín
  Blaž Kavčič

The following players received entry from the qualifying draw:
  Mirza Bašić
  Lukáš Klein
  Zdeněk Kolář
  Kacper Żuk

The following player received entry as a lucky loser:
  Andrea Collarini

Champions

Singles

  Kacper Żuk def.  Mathias Bourgue 6–4, 6–2.

Doubles

 Szymon Walków /  Jan Zieliński def.  Grégoire Barrère /  Albano Olivetti 6–2, 7–5.

References

2021 ATP Challenger Tour
2021 in Croatian tennis
April 2021 sports events in Croatia
Split Open